KKFM (98.1 FM) is a radio station out of Colorado Springs and Pueblo, Colorado. It plays a classic rock format and is under ownership of Cumulus Media.

KKFM originally broadcast at 96.5 FM. In 1986, 96.5 KKFM changed from playing contemporary hit radio to playing "Colorado Classics" (including AOR rock). 96.5 KKFM later became 98.1 KKFM. It switched to 98.1 at 5:30 a.m. on September 14, 1992, allowing two new stations to sign on: KBIQ (now KIBT) 96.1 in Colorado Springs, and KXPK 96.5 in Denver.

The station features mornings with The Bob & Tom Show, Chuck Squire middays, and Tron at nights. Weekends including programming from Alice Cooper Saturday Nights, Sammy Hagar and Matt Pinfield on Sunday, and the KKFM New Music Pipeline featuring new songs by classic rock artists on Sunday night has left the building along with JP.

KKFM is now the classic rock leader in Colorado Springs, after former competitor KYZX transitioned out of its classic rock format to alternative from 2008 till 2009.

References

External links
KKFM official website

KFM
Cumulus Media radio stations
Classic rock radio stations in the United States
Radio stations established in 1959
1959 establishments in Colorado